Ime Akpan  (born 27 April 1972) is a retired female track and field athlete from Nigeria, who competed in the women's 100 metres hurdling event during her career.  She is a one-time Olympian (1996), and won a gold medal at the 1991 All-Africa Games in Cairo, Egypt

Competition record

References

External links
 
 

1972 births
Living people
Nigerian female hurdlers
Olympic athletes of Nigeria
Athletes (track and field) at the 1996 Summer Olympics
African Games gold medalists for Nigeria
African Games medalists in athletics (track and field)
African Games bronze medalists for Nigeria
Universiade medalists in athletics (track and field)
Athletes (track and field) at the 1991 All-Africa Games
Athletes (track and field) at the 1995 All-Africa Games
Universiade bronze medalists for Nigeria
Competitors at the 1991 Summer Universiade
Competitors at the 1993 Summer Universiade
Medalists at the 1995 Summer Universiade
20th-century Nigerian women
21st-century Nigerian women